Oğuz Aral (1936 – 26 July 2004) was a Turkish political cartoonist and comics artist, known for his satirical style. He was also active as a theatre designer, playwright, ceramist and animator, establishing the first Turkish animation studio.

Biography
Born in Silivri, Istanbul Province, he founded the cartoon magazine Gırgır (Fun) with his brother Tekin Aral, and created such characters as "Avanak Avni" (Avni the Gullible), "Köstebek Hüsnü" (Hüsnü the Mole), "Utanmaz Adam" (the Shameless Man) and "Vites Mahmut" (Mahmut the Gearbox). GırGır was one of the best selling cartoon magazines in Europe in the 1970s with nearly a million copies a week.

Called the "godfather" of Turkish cartoonists, Aral mentored scores of young artists, helping them publish their comics. Gırgır, known to be outstandingly critical of all social ills, was banned after the 1980 military coup, but Oğuz Aral's cartoons still ran in the newspaper Hürriyet until his death in Bodrum.

Oğuz Aral was interred at the Zincirlikuyu Cemetery in Istanbul. He is survived by a son.

References

 Biyografi.net - Biography of Oğuz Aral
 Lambiek Comiclopedia article.

1936 births
2004 deaths
People from Silivri
Turkish cartoonists
Turkish comics artists
Turkish satirists
Turkish dramatists and playwrights
Turkish animators
Turkish animated film directors
Turkish animated film producers
Turkish ceramists
Theatre designers
Burials at Zincirlikuyu Cemetery
Turkish magazine founders